Kane & Abel, formally known as 'Double Vision', is an American hip hop duo formed by twin brothers Daniel and David Garcia that were founded by Master P in late 1995. They were best known for their time with No Limit Records.

Music career

1995: Keep Your Eyes Open
In early 1995, Kane & Abel signed to independent label Doral Records as Double Vision, they then released their debut album, Keep Your Eyes Open.

1996: 7 Sins
In 1996, Kane & Abel signed to Master P's record label No Limit Records. On October 8, 1996, they released their second album and first for No Limit entitled, 7 Sins. It was moderately successful, peaking at No. 179 on the Billboard 200 and No. 29 on the Top R&B/Hip-Hop Albums charts.

1998: Am I My Brother's Keeper
On July 7, 1998 Kane & Abel released their third album, Am I My Brother's Keeper. It was successful, selling 250,000 copies its first week, and peaked at No. 5 on the Billboard 200 and No. 1 on the Top R&B/Hip-Hop Albums charts.

1999: Rise To Power
In 1999, Kane & Abel left from No Limit Records and started their own label entitled, Most Wanted Empire, later securing a new label deal with Elektra Records. On September 21, 1999, Kane & Abel released their fourth album, Rise to Power. It peaked at No. 61 on the Billboard 200 and No. 11 on the Top R&B/Hip-Hop Albums chart.

2000-02: Most Wanted & The Last Ones Left
In 2000, Kane & Abel secured a new label deal with Geffen and MCA. On September 26, 2000, they released their fifth album, Most Wanted.  It peaked at No. 194 on the Billboard 200 and No. 40 on the Top R&B/Hip-Hop Albums chart. On October 15, 2002, Kane & Abel released their fifth album, The Last Ones Left via Entertainment Solutions.  This was because Kane & Abel were dropped from Geffen and MCA due to their legal issues at the time.  The album failed to chart on any of the Billboard's listing, partly due their incarceration at the time.

2010: Back On Money
In 2010, Kane & Abel secured a new label deal with E1 Music. On September 26, 2010, their sixth album  Back On Money was issued and was their first in six years.

Writing
On April 1, 1999, Kane & Abel released their first written novel entitled Eyes of a Killer/Behind Enemy Lines.

Legal issues
In 1999, Kane & Abel became entangled in a federal case involving the activities of convicted New Orleans drug lord Richard Pena. Investigators alleged that Kane & Abel distributed cocaine for Pena. During the investigation, they were asked to testify against No Limit Records CEO Master P, but the rappers refused, Master P was never charged in the case. In June (two years after Pena had pleaded guilty on his own), Kane & Abel agreed to a plea bargain that would allow the brothers to plead guilty to drug possession with intent to distribute. Under the agreement, they served  six months in a prison boot camp and the rest of the 24-month sentence in a halfway house, or home detention. On May 7, 2001, Kane & Abel's lawyers reached an agreement with prosecutors in which they admitted to committing misprision of a felony, by refusing to report to federal agents about the activities of drug lord Richard Pena. On September 14, 2001, it was reported that Kane & Abel were sentenced to three years in jail in the federal case due to them admitting to committing misprision of a felony (which meant that they refused to report, or concealed a crime.

Discography

Studio albums

Collaboration albums

Soundtrack albums

Compilation albums

Singles

As lead artist

As featured artist

Guest appearances

 1997
 "Pop Goes My 9" off the TRU album Tru 2 da Game
 "West to South' off the Steady Mobb'n album Pre-Meditated Drama 
 "For Realz" off the I'm Bout It soundtrack
 "Mama's Family" of the Mia X album Unlady Like
 "5 Hollow points" of the Mr. Serv-On album Life Insurance
 "Throw 'em Up" off the Master P album Ghetto D
 1998
 "What Gangstas Do" off the Silkk The Shocker album Charge It 2 da Game
 "Soldiers" off the C-Murder album Life or Death
 "Tell Me What You're Lookin' For" off the I Got The Hook Up soundtrack
 "What Cha Mean" off the Fiend album There's One in Every Family
 "N.L. Party" off the Soulja Slim album Give It 2 'Em Raw
 "Hot Boys and Girls" off the Master P album MP da Last Don
 "Wooo" off the Mac album Shell Shocked
 "Gimpin'" off the Magic album Sky's the Limit
 "Money Makes.." off the Prime Suspects album Guilty 'til Proven Innocent
 "Puttin' It Down" off the Mia X album Mama Drama
 "It's a Riot" off the We Can't Be Stopped compilation
 1999
 "Tank Nigga" off the Mr. Serv-On album Da Next Level
 "Ghetto Boy" off the C-Murder album Bossalinie
 "Yes Indeed" off the Foolish soundtrack
 2001
 "Fearless" off the Graveyard Soldjas album, 3 Time Losers
 "Swamp" off the Off The Tank compilation
 "Let Me Get Up In Ya" off the Off The Tank compilation
 "At Yo' Service" off the Lil Italy album Full Blown
 "Money" of the Partners-N-Crime album, World Premiere
 "Souljaz" off the 812 Souljaz album, Four Corner Hustler
 2004
 "Can I Ball" off the Masa' Smoke album, The Mandingo Warrior

References

External links
Official Myspace

Southern hip hop groups
Hip hop duos
Musical groups established in 1995
Musical groups from Florida
Musical groups from New Orleans
No Limit Records artists
Sibling musical duos
Xavier University alumni
Gangsta rap groups